Westside is the fifth studio album by Singaporean singer JJ Lin, released on 29 June 2007 by Ocean Butterflies.

Track listing
 "獨白" (Confession)
 "殺手" (The Killa)
 "殺手@續" (The Awakening)
 "西界" (Westside)
 "無聊" (J-Fusion)
 "單挑" (1 vs. 1)
 "K-O"
 "大男人小女孩" (Boyfriend Girlfriend)
 "L-O-V-E"
 "發現愛" (Love in the Air) feat. Kym
 "不流淚的機場" (Flying on Your Wings)
 "Baby Baby"
 "自由不變" (Freedom)
 "江南" (Cantonese Version)

References

JJ Lin albums
2007 albums